is a 1962 color Japanese comedy film directed by Kon Ichikawa. It was Japan's submission to the 35th Academy Awards for the Academy Award for Best Foreign Language Film, but was not accepted as a nominee.

Style
Ichikawa utilized the screen personas of popular stars Fujiko Yamamoto (glamorous, restrained) and Eiji Funakoshi (hapless, self-conscious) to make the child's independence and frequent endangerment believable. The director contrasts Chiyo's well-coiffed, reactive approach to motherhood by shooting Misako Watanabe as her sister-in-law in a sensuous, intimate manner as she bathes her own newborn.

Cast
 Hiro Suzuki as Taro, the baby
 Eiji Funakoshi as Goro, the father
 Fujiko Yamamoto as Chiyo, the mother
 Kumeko Urabe as Ino, grandmother
 Misako Watanabe as Setsuko, the aunt
 Masako Kyôzuka as Chiyo's sister
 Mantarō Ushio as Laundry Man
 Kyōko Kishida as Chiyo's Friend
 Shirô Ôtsuji as Doctor
 Jun Hamamura as Older Doctor
 Akira Natsuki as Doctor at Hospital

See also
 List of submissions to the 35th Academy Awards for Best Foreign Language Film
 List of Japanese submissions for the Academy Award for Best Foreign Language Film

References

External links

1962 films
1962 comedy films
1960s Japanese-language films
Films directed by Kon Ichikawa
Daiei Film films
Best Film Kinema Junpo Award winners
Films with screenplays by Natto Wada
Films scored by Yasushi Akutagawa
1960s Japanese films